Nicholas Haddock (1723 – 19 July 1781) was an English politician who sat in the House of Commons from 1754 to 1761.

Haddock was the son of Admiral Nicholas Haddock who was also MP for Rochester and the grandson of Admiral Sir Richard Haddock. He inherited Wrotham Place from his father in 1746.

Haddock was elected Member of Parliament for Rochester in 1754 and held the seat to 1761.

Haddock died on 19 July 1781, aged 58.

Haddock married Miss Medhurst of Wrotham, but had no children. Wrotham Place passed to his brother and heir-at-law, Charles Haddock.

References

British MPs 1754–1761
1723 births
1781 deaths
Members of the Parliament of Great Britain for English constituencies